Columbea is a clade suggested by genome analysis that contains Columbiformes (pigeons and doves), Pteroclidae (sandgrouse), Mesitornithidae (mesites) and Mirandornithes (flamingos and grebes). Until their recent placement as the sister taxon to Passerea, in the last decade various genetic analysis found them to be in the obsolete clade Metaves.

References

Neognathae